The 2010 Utah State Aggies football team represented Utah State University in the 2010 NCAA Division I FBS college football season. The Aggies were led by second-year head coach Gary Andersen and played their home games at Romney Stadium. They finished the season with a record of 4–8 (2–6 WAC). The Aggies won the Beehive Boot for the first time since 1997.

Schedule

NFL Draft
3rd Round, 90th Overall Pick by the Philadelphia Eagles—Sr. CB Curtis Marsh

References

Utah State
Utah State Aggies football seasons
Utah State Aggies football